Michael Szewczyk (born 1973), known as DJ Textbeak, is an American DJ, artist and record producer.

DJ Textbeak is known internationally for his varied style of dark and experimental music including remixes for ∆AIMON, Cyanotic, 3Teeth, Architect, among others. In 2016, he was a support act for Modern English.

He is considered influential in the Witch house genre for his early introduction of the movement and exclusive contributions of remixes.  He was a contributor to the Zombie Nation song "The Mind of Many."

Early life 
Textbeak grew up raised by his single mother and grandparents who helped explore his interest in sounds from classical composition to film documentaries and environmental noise. In his early teens, he was able to orchestrate these sounds through modular distortion and sampling.

Forming his sound, Textbeak was musically grouped with and appealed to punk, dark electro, and techno genres. In 1991 he moved to Columbus, Ohio to start the rave group Body Release with Todd Sines, Titonton Duvante (Residual Records) and Charles Noel (Archetype), to tour the United States.

By 1993 Textbeak was known as The Cobbler and signed and released original material through Jevan Records, a goth and industrial label, in what he classified as musically "alien, cerebral, and scary." The group project entitled Bath was nominated for music awards. During this time, he began remixing other acts on the label and befriended artist and poet Lorin Morgan-Richards.

Career 
In 1998, he began releasing solo material and performing internationally alongside acts Merzbow, Tamara Sky, Larry Tee, Nitzer Ebb, and Meat Beat Manifesto to name a few.

In 2011, Textbeak started his own 2-hour satellite program entitled TXTBK's CHVяCH XV BяXK3N 7ANGvAG3 featuring original and remixed tracks of new witch, experimental, industrial, and electro. In the same year, he was invited to participate in an exhibit entitled Necessary Discomforts, a tribute to Rozz Williams at the Hyaena Gallery. In creating artwork, Textbeak's approach is similar to his filter of music, applying collage samples of visual information into a base of painting and illustration. Textbeak also has produced a large body of digital work.

In 2016, Auxiliary Magazine nominated Textbeak best DJ of the year.

Personal life 
In 2022, Textbeak married artist Noelle Solringen in Detroit.

Discography

As Bath

Solo albums

Singles & EPs

DJ Mixes

References

External links 
Textbeak official website
Textbeak on Soundcloud
Facebook page

Living people
1973 births
American DJs
Remixers